The 1884–85 season is the 11th season of competitive football by Rangers.

Overview
Rangers played a total matches during the 1884–85 season.

Results
All results are written with Rangers' score first.

Scottish Cup

Appearances

See also
 1884–85 in Scottish football
 1884–85 Scottish Cup

External links
1884–85 Rangers F.C.Results

Rangers F.C. seasons
Rangers